Joe "King" Carrasco and the Crowns is an album by Joe Carrasco. It was released by Stiff Records (SEEZ 28) on October 10, 1980, in the United Kingdom. An American version with a different track listing and cover design was released by Hannibal Records (HNBL 1308) around the same time.

Critical reception
Trouser Press wrote that the band's forte "is performing '96 Tears' under a variety of thin guises, all of them delightful ('Let’s Get Pretty', 'Betty’s World', you name it). The tempos are revved-up punk, the feeling, Southwestern mestizo." Robert Christgau deemed the album "minimalism with roots, kind of--the irony in these calls to fun is a lot sweeter, a lot surer of its ground, than New Yorkers commonly get away with."

Stiff album track listing
All listed tracks were composed by Joe "King" Carrasco and Johnny Perez; except where indicated

Side 1
"Buena"
"Betty's World"
"I Get My Kicks On You" (Joe "King" Carrasco)
"One More Time" (Roy Head)
"Don't Bug Me Baby" (Joe "King" Carrasco, Johnny Perez, Brad Kizer)
"Nervoused Out"

Side 2
"Caca De Vaca" (Joe "King" Carrasco)
"Susan Friendly"
"Party Doll" (Buddy Knox, Dave Alldred, Donny Lanier, Jimmy Bowen)
"Federales"
"Wild 14"
"Let's Get Pretty"

Hannibal album track listing

Side 1
"Houston El Mover"
"One More Time"
"Caca de Vaca"
"Let's Get Pretty"
"Bad, Bad Girl"
"Don't Bug Me Baby"
"Federales"

Side 2
"Buena"
"Nervoused Out"
"Betty's World"
"I Get My Kicks On You"
"Party Doll"
"Gimme Sody, Judy"

Personnel
 Joe "King" Carrasco - guitar, vocals
 Kris Cummings - keyboards
 Brad Kizer - bass
 Mike Navarro - drums

References

External links
Joeking.com

1980 albums
Stiff Records albums
Hannibal Records albums